Star Parker  is an American syndicated columnist, Republican politician, author, and conservative political activist. In 1995, she founded the Center for Urban Renewal and Education (CURE). In 2010, she was the unsuccessful Republican nominee for the United States House of Representatives in California's 37th District.

Biography
Parker was born Larstella Irby in Moses Lake, Washington; she was raised in a non-religious home by often-absent parents.  She has made the claim that after one arrest for shoplifting, her high school guidance counselor told her "not to worry about it, because I was a 'victim of racism, lashing out at society.'"  She began advocating for conservative social and political causes, and founded CURE in 1995. After she was laid off from her job as a program host on Los Angeles radio station KABC (after the outlet was purchased by Disney), Parker devoted her efforts to CURE full-time.

Center for Urban Renewal and Education
In 1995, Parker founded the Coalition on Urban Renewal and Education, and later changed its name to the Center for Urban Renewal and Education (CURE). Located in Washington, D.C., CURE is a policy-oriented and politically conservative think-tank; Parker serves as its president.

Activities
Parker has been a syndicated columnist with the Creator's News Syndicate. Her column is carried weekly by newspapers across the country and opinion sites such as Townhall. She was a guest on the TV program Politically Incorrect.

In 2017, Star Parker joined the White House Center for Faith and Opportunity Initiatives advisory team to share ideas on which policies would improve the nation's most distressed zip codes.

In 2018, she was appointed by Senate Majority Leader Mitch McConnell to the U.S. Frederick Douglass Bicentennial Commission.

Views
Parker supports cuts to welfare claiming that welfare has become like a government plantation, which creates a situation where those who accept the invitation switch mindsets from "How do I take care of myself?" to "What do I have to do to stay on the plantation?". She believes stable families and strong moral values are the key to ending poverty. She has asserted a moral objection to abortion and claims that rampant abortion has hurt black families. She opposes abortion, divorce, same-sex marriage and using tax dollars to fund birth control.

Congressional campaign
In March 2010, Parker announced her candidacy for Congress in California's 37th District, which encompasses most of Long Beach and Compton, as well as Carson, Signal Hill, and parts of other municipalities. She lost the November 2 general election to Democrat Laura Richardson, earning 22.7 percent of the vote.

Books
 1998: Pimps, Whores and Welfare Brats: From Welfare Cheat to Conservative Messenger (Pocket Books)
 2003: Uncle Sam's Plantation: How Big Government Enslaves America's Poor and What We Can Do About It (Thomas Nelson)
 2006: White Ghetto: How Middle Class America Reflects Inner City Decay (Thomas Nelson)
 2014: Blind Conceit: Politics, Policy and Racial Polarization: Moving Forward to Save America (Sumner Books)
 2019: Necessary Noise: How Donald Trump Inflames the Culture War and Why This Is Good News for America (Center Street)

See also
 Black conservatism in the United States

References

External links

 

1956 births
Living people
21st-century American journalists
21st-century Christians
21st-century American women writers
Activists from California
African-American Christians
African-American journalists
American columnists
American political commentators
American political writers
American anti-abortion activists
California Republicans
American Christian creationists
Christians from California
Discrimination against LGBT people in the United States
E. W. Scripps Company people
Female critics of feminism
Journalists from California
Los Angeles City College alumni
Woodbury University alumni
American women non-fiction writers
American women columnists
Black conservatism in the United States
21st-century African-American women
21st-century African-American people
20th-century African-American people
20th-century African-American women